State Route 208 (SR 208) is a  state highway located in the west-central part of the U.S. state of Georgia. It runs east from a point between Columbus and Hamilton. It passes through Harris County, Talbot County, and Taylor County.

Route description
SR 208 begins at an intersection with US 27/SR 1, south-southeast of Hamilton. It heads southeast to Waverly Hall, where it intersects US 27 Alternate/SR 85 (Warm Springs Road). Northeast of Waverly Hall, it enters Talbot County and meets SR 36. About  before entering Talbotton, it intersects SR 315 (Ellerslie Highway). In Talbotton, the road briefly runs concurrent with US 80/SR 22/SR 41. At the eastern end of the concurrency, SR 208 runs concurrent with SR 90. To the east, it enters Taylor County and intersects US 19/SR 3, north of Butler. SR 208 continues east to its eastern terminus at SR 137, northeast of Butler.

SR 208 is not part of the National Highway System, a system of roadways important to the nation's economy, defense, and mobility.

Major intersections

See also

References

External links

 Georgia Roads (Routes 201 - 220)

208
Transportation in Harris County, Georgia
Transportation in Talbot County, Georgia
Transportation in Taylor County, Georgia